Lion Kaak (born 26 June 1991) is a Dutch professional footballer who plays as a midfielder for Eerste Divisie club De Graafschap.

Club career
Kaak played as a youth for Pax Hengelo and then joined local Eredivisie side De Graafschap in 2001. He progressed through the youth system until he was promoted to the first team in 2009. Two years later, Kaak made his professional debut for the club, on 13 March 2011 in a home match against ADO Den Haag, where he replaced Gregor Breinburg.

In June 2012, Kaak signed a two-year contract with AGOVV. Six months later, in January 2013, the club went bankrupt and he joined Go Ahead Eagles on a free until the end of the season. In the summer of 2013, he trained with his former club, De Graafschap. In July 2013, Kaak signed with Spanish club Valencia CF Mestalla, the reserve team of Valencia CF. He also trained several times with the Valencia first team and on the last matchday of the 2013–14 season, he sat on the bench. However, he did not make an appearance.

In 2014, he returned to the Netherlands, where he began playing for second-tier Eerste Divisie club Achilles '29. In the first league match on 9 August against Jong PSV (0–2 away loss), Kaak made his debut in the starting lineup, where he would remain in the following months. On 1 December, he provided an assist from a corner kick to Mehmet Dingil against FC Volendam. Because he played for Achilles '29 on an amateur basis, he was able to sign on a free transfer with his childhood club, De Graafschap, in January 2015, on a one-and-a-half year contract. On 27 January 2015, Kaak made his official return to the club as a 83rd-minute substitute in a 2–0 away win over SC Telstar.

In the summer of 2017, Kaak moved to FC Oss, which became TOP Oss from 1 July 2018. In 2019, he signed a contract extension, which would keep him in Oss until 2022.

On 20 June 2022, De Graafschap announced that Kaak would return to the club from the 2022–23 season, his third spell with the club.

International career
Kaak has represented the Netherlands at under-16 level, gaining his first cap as a starter in a friendly against Italy on 14 March 2007, before being replaced by Cayfano Latupeirissa in the 58th minute of a 2–1 loss.

Style of play
Kaak is right-footed. He typically plays as a defensive midfielder. During his time with TOP Oss, he has been described as a strong personality on the pitch who is "guarding the standards, values and mentality of the club".

Career statistics

References

External links

1991 births
21st-century Dutch people
Living people
Sportspeople from Hengelo
Dutch footballers
Netherlands youth international footballers
Association football midfielders
De Graafschap players
Valencia CF Mestalla footballers
Go Ahead Eagles players
Achilles '29 players
TOP Oss players
Eredivisie players
Eerste Divisie players
Dutch expatriate footballers
Dutch expatriate sportspeople in Spain
Expatriate footballers in Spain
Footballers from Overijssel